The 1953 Washington Huskies football team was an American football team that represented the University of Washington during the 1953 college football season. In its first season under head coach John Cherberg, the team compiled a 3–6–1 record, finished in seventh place in the Pacific Coast Conference, and outscored its opponents by a combined total of 217 to 154. Vern Lindskog was the team captain.

Schedule

NFL Draft selections
Four University of Washington Huskies were selected in the 1954 NFL Draft, which lasted thirty rounds with 360 selections.

References

Washington
Washington Huskies football seasons
Washington Huskies football